Statenice is a municipality and village in Prague-West District in the Central Bohemian Region of the Czech Republic. It has about 1,500 inhabitants.

Administrative parts
The village of Černý Vůl is an administrative part of Statenice.

References

Villages in Prague-West District